House dust mites (HDM, or simply dust mites) are various species of acariform mites belonging to the family Pyroglyphidae that are found in association with dust in dwellings. They are known for causing allergies.

Biology

Species
The currently known species are:
 Dermatophagoides farinae (American house dust mite)
 Dermatophagoides pteronyssinus (European house dust mite)
 Dermatophagoides evansi
 Dermatophagoides microceras
 Dermatophagoides halterophilus
 Dermatophagoides siboney
 Dermatophagoides neotropicalis
 Dermatophagoides alexfaini
 Dermatophagoides anisopoda
 Dermatophagoides chirovi
 Dermatophagoides deanei
 Dermatophagoides rwandae
 Dermatophagoides scheremeteroskyi
 Dermatophagoides scheremetewskyi
 Dermatophagoides simplex
 Euroglyphus maynei (Mayne's house dust mite)
 Euroglyphus longior
 Hirstia domicola
 Malayoglyphus carmelitus
 Malayoglyphus intermedius
 Pyroglyphus africanus
 Sturnophagoides brasiliensis
 Blomia tropicalis

Taxonomy
The dust mites are cosmopolitan members of the mite family Pyroglyphidae.

Characteristics

House dust mites, due to their very small size and translucent bodies, are barely visible to the unaided eye. A typical house dust mite measures 0.2–0.3 mm in length. The body of the house dust mite has a striated cuticle.

House dust mite faecal pellets range from 10 to 40 µm.

Diet
They feed on skin flakes from humans and other animals, and on some mold. Dermatophagoides farinae fungal food choices in 16 tested species commonly found in homes was observed in vitro to be Alternaria alternata, Cladosporium sphaerospermum, and Wallemia sebi, and they disliked Penicillium chrysogenum, Aspergillus versicolor, and Stachybotrys chartarum.

Predators
The predators of dust mites are other allergenic mites (Cheyletiella), silverfish and pseudoscorpions.

Reproduction
The average life cycle for a house dust mite is 65–100 days. A mated female house dust mite can live up to 70 days, laying 60 to 100 eggs in the last five weeks of her life. In a 10-week life span, a house dust mite will produce approximately 2,000 fecal particles and an even larger number of partially digested enzyme-covered dust particles.

Distribution 
Dust mites are found worldwide, but are more common in humid regions. The species Blomia tropicalis is typically found only in tropical or subtropical regions. Detectable dust mite allergen was found in the beds of about 84% of surveyed United States homes. In Europe, detectable Der p 1 or Der f 1 allergen was found in 68% of surveyed homes.

Health issues

Asthma
House dust mite antigens are strongly associated with asthma development and severity; they are estimated to contribute to 60-90% of cases.

Allergies

Tropomyosin, the major allergen in dust mites, is also responsible for shellfish allergy.

Oral mite anaphylaxis
Dermatophagoides spp. can cause oral mite anaphylaxis (AKA pancake syndrome) when found in flour.

See also

References

External links

 Dust Mite Allergy on the Asthma and Allergy Foundation of America website

Acari and humans
Acariformes
Arthropod common names
Arthropod infestations
Building biology
Cosmopolitan arthropods
Dust